In mathematics, especially in the areas of abstract algebra known as universal algebra, group theory, ring theory, and module theory, a subdirect product is a subalgebra of a direct product that depends fully on all its factors without however necessarily being the whole direct product.  The notion was introduced by Birkhoff in 1944 and has proved to be a powerful generalization of the notion of direct product.

Definition
A subdirect product is a subalgebra (in the sense of universal algebra) A of a direct product ΠiAi such that every induced projection (the composite pjs: A → Aj of a projection pj: ΠiAi → Aj with the subalgebra inclusion s: A → ΠiAi) is surjective.

A direct (subdirect) representation of an algebra A is a direct (subdirect) product isomorphic to A.

An algebra is called subdirectly irreducible if it is not subdirectly representable by "simpler" algebras.  Subdirect irreducibles are to subdirect product of algebras roughly as primes are to multiplication of integers.

Examples
 Any distributive lattice L is subdirectly representable as a subalgebra of a direct power of the two-element distributive lattice.  This can be viewed as an algebraic formulation of the representability of L as a set of sets closed under the binary operations of union and intersection, via the interpretation of the direct power itself as a power set.  In the finite case such a representation is direct (i.e. the whole direct power) if and only if L is a complemented lattice, i.e. a Boolean algebra.
 The same holds for any semilattice when "semilattice" is substituted for "distributive lattice" and "subsemilattice" for "sublattice" throughout the preceding example.  That is, every semilattice is representable as a subdirect power of the two-element semilattice.
 The chain of natural numbers together with infinity, as a Heyting algebra, is subdirectly representable as a subalgebra of the direct product of the finite linearly ordered Heyting algebras.  The situation with other Heyting algebras is treated in further detail in the article on subdirect irreducibles.
 The group of integers under addition is subdirectly representable by any (necessarily infinite) family of arbitrarily large finite cyclic groups.  In this representation, 0 is the sequence of identity elements of the representing groups, 1 is a sequence of generators chosen from the appropriate group, and integer addition and negation are the corresponding group operations in each group applied coordinate-wise.  The representation is faithful (no two integers are represented by the same sequence) because of the size requirement, and the projections are onto because every coordinate eventually exhausts its group.
 Every vector space over a given field is subdirectly representable by the one-dimensional space over that field, with the finite-dimensional spaces being directly representable in this way.  (For vector spaces, as for abelian groups, direct product with finitely many factors is synonymous with direct sum with finitely many factors, whence subdirect product and subdirect sum are also synonymous for finitely many factors.)

See also 
 Semidirect product
 Goursat's lemma

References
 
 

Universal algebra